Tridrepana subtusmaculata is a moth in the family Drepanidae. It was described by Max Gaede in 1933. It is found on Peninsular Malaysia and Borneo.

The wingspan is about 31.4-36.8 mm.

References

Moths described in 1933
Drepaninae